The FIBA Under-18 Women's Asian Championship is an international under-18 basketball championship in the International Basketball Federation's FIBA Asia zone. The tournament started in 1970, and is held biennially. The top four teams qualify toward the FIBA Under-17 Women's Basketball World Cup.

Aside from renaming the tournament to FIBA Under-18 Women's Asian Championship, it is now composed of two divisions (namely Divisions A and B) with a maximum of eight teams each to participate.

Division A teams now contest for the four slots allocated for the FIBA Under-19 Women's Basketball World Cup, meaning the semifinalists are assured of a seat in the U19 Worlds. Meanwhile, the team that places eighth and last in the division is relegated to Division B in the next tournament. The remaining top seven or eight teams are retained up to the next tournament as well.

Division B teams use the same format as that of Division A, but unlike the previous setup wherein there were qualifying matches for the top two teams of the division, only the Division Champions are promoted to Division A in the next tournament.

Summary

Division A

Division B

Medal table

Participating nations

 Starting 2017, a new tournament format will be introduced; two Divisions will be created: Division A and Division B.

Division A

Division B

Under-19 Women's World Cup record

See also
 FIBA Under-16 Women's Asian Championship
 FIBA Under-19 Women's Basketball World Cup
 FIBA Under-18 Asian Championship

References

 

 
Recurring sporting events established in 1970
Women's basketball competitions in Asia between national teams
1970 establishments in Asia
Asia